The UEFA Women's Championship is an association football competition established in 1982. It is contested by the women's national teams of the members of the Union of European Football Associations (UEFA), the sport's European governing body, and takes place every four years. The winners of the first final were Sweden, who defeated England 4–3 on penalties in Luton, after a 1–0 win in Gothenburg and a 1–0 loss in Luton in a two-legged tie. The most recent final was won by England, who beat Germany 2–1 after extra time in London.

The Women's Championship final is the last match of the competition, and the result determines which country's team is declared European champion. As of the 2022 tournament, if after 90 minutes of regular play the score is a draw, an additional 30-minute period of play, called extra time, is added. If such a game is still tied after extra time, it is decided by penalty shoot-out. The team that wins the penalty shoot-out are then declared champions. The 13 finals to-date have produced two drawn matches, which were determined by penalty shoot-out (1984) and golden goal (2001).

The most successful team is Germany, who have won eight titles. Norway has won the competition twice. Sweden, England and the Netherlands have won one title each, whilst Italy has reached the final twice without winning.

List of finals

Results by nation

Notes

References

External links
UEFA Women's Euro at UEFA.com

 
UEFA Women's Championship